John Boyle may refer to:

Arts and entertainment
John J. Boyle (sculptor) (1851–1917), American sculptor
John W. Boyle (1891–1959), American cinematographer
John Boyle (artist) (born 1941), Canadian painter
Johnny Boyle (fl. 2000s), Irish drummer in band The Frames

Nobility
John Boyle, 2nd Earl of Glasgow (1688–1740), Scottish nobleman
John Boyle, 5th Earl of Cork (1707–1762), Irish author and nobleman
John Boyle, 3rd Earl of Glasgow (1714–1775), Scottish nobleman
John Boyle, 14th Earl of Cork (1916–2003), Irish peer
John Boyle, 15th Earl of Cork (born 1945), Irish peer

Politics and law
John Boyle (fl. 1417), English politician, MP for Worcester
John Boyle (congressman) (1774–1835), American politician and judge, U.S. Representative from Kentucky
John Boyle (Northern Ireland politician) (1870/1–1950), Northern Irish politician
John Robert Boyle (1871–1936), Canadian politician
John Boyle Jr. (1876–1936), Irish-American lawyer and politician
John J. Boyle (attorney) (born 1885), United States Attorney
John Patrick Boyle (1880–1968), American lawyer and politician

Sports
Jack Boyle (John Anthony Boyle, 1866–1913), American baseball player
Johnny Boyle (Gaelic footballer) (1931–2017), Irish Gaelic footballer
John Boyle (wrestler) (born 1934), Australian Olympic wrestler
John Boyle (footballer, born 1946), Scottish footballer (Chelsea, Tampa Bay Rowdies)
John Boyle (footballer, born 1986), Scottish footballer (Airdrie)

Others
John Boyle (bishop) ( 1563–1620), English Protestant bishop in Ireland
John Andrew Boyle (1916–1978), British Orientalist and historian
John J. Boyle (printer) (1919–2003), Public Printer of the United States

See also
Jack Boyle (disambiguation)
John Boyle O'Reilly (1844–1890), Irish-born poet and novelist